Kovai Sarala is an Indian actress and comedian, who prominently plays supporting roles in Tamil and Telugu films. She has won the Tamil Nadu State Film Award for Best Comedian three times, for her performances in Sathi Leelavathi (1995), Poovellam Un Vasam (2001) and Uliyin Osai (2008). She has also won the two Nandi Awards for Best Female Comedian and the Vijay Award for Best Comedian for her performance in Kanchana (2011). She is now part of Kamal Haasan's Makkal Needhi Maiam Party.

She has acted with all the top comedians including Brahmanandam, Goundamani, Senthil, Vadivelu and Vivek. Her comedy tracks with Vadivelu were especially very popular.

Early and present life
Kovai Sarala was born in a Malayali family in Coimbatore, Tamil Nadu (then in Madras State). She had developed interest in acting, after watching MGR's films. She completed her studies and entered the film industry with the support of her sister and father.

She got her first film offer when she was in the 9th standard and acted with Vijayakumar and K. R. Vijaya in the film Velli Ratham. She was in Class 10, when she played a 32-year-old pregnant woman Mundhanai Mudichu, her second film. Two years later she acted in Chinna Veedu, where she played the 65-year-old mother of Bhagyaraj's character. She has appeared in more than 300+ films in Tamil, Telugu, Malayalam and Kannada. She has mentioned the films Sathi Leelavathi, Viralukketha Veekkam, Varavu Ettana Selavu Pathana, Karakattakkaran and Viswanathan Ramamoorthy as her personal favourites.

She has also worked in television series and television shows. She worked as a regular guest judge on Asatha Povathu Yaaru? and has hosted the reality show Paasa Paravaigal. In 2013, she was the judge on the Tamil comedy show "Comedyil Kalakkuvathu Eppadi" that airs on Vijay TV. Now she is regular judge on the Tamil comedy show "Varuthapadatha valibar sangam" that airs on Zee Tamil. Also hosting kids game show "Chellame chellam" on Sun TV.

Personal life
Sarala is not married. She looks after the children of her relatives, as she considers them to be her own.

Filmography

Tamil

Telugu

Malayalam

Kannada

Singer
Thekkathi Mappillai (Magalirkaaga)
Rama Rama (Villu)
Marugo marugo (Sathi Leelavathi)

Television
 Sundari Soundari (Sun TV)
 Ellame Siripputhan (Kalaignar TV)
 Vanthaana Thanthaana (Kalaignar TV)
 Sabhash Meera (Jaya TV)
 Sagalakala Sarala (Vijay TV)
 Comedyil Kalakkuvathu Eppadi (Vijay TV)
 Vantintlo Wonders (Gemini TV)
 Varuthapadatha Valibar Sangam (Zee Tamil)
 Chellame Chellam (Sun TV)
 Arundhathi (Sun TV)
 Kutty Chutties (Sun TV)
 Kalakka Povathu Yaaru? - (Seasons 1–5,8-9 (Star Vijay) - Judge

Awards

Tamil Nadu State Film Awards
Best Comedian - Sathi Leelavathi (1995)
Best Comedian -  Poovellam Un Vasam (2001)
Best Comedian - Uliyin Osai (2008)

Vijay Awards
Vijay Award for Best Comedian - Kanchana (2011)

Nandi Awards
Best Female Comedian - Rayalaseema Ramanna Chowdary (2000)
Best Female Comedian - Ori Nee Prema Bangaram Kaanu (2003)

References

External links
 

Actresses in Tamil cinema
Actresses in Telugu cinema
Actresses in Malayalam cinema
Actresses in Kannada cinema
Telugu comedians
Indian film actresses
Living people
Malayali people
Tamil comedians
Indian women comedians
Nandi Award winners
Indian television actresses
Tamil television actresses
People from Coimbatore
Actresses from Tamil Nadu
20th-century Indian actresses
21st-century Indian actresses
Actresses in Tamil television
Year of birth missing (living people)